A.S.P. Towers (also known as Kooy-e Nobonyad-e Vanak, Persian: ساختمانهای آ.اس.پ) are amongst the most well-known buildings in Tehran, Iran. They're located in the neighbourhood of Amir Abad and Yusef Abad in the corner of Kordestan and Hakim Highway.

They were among the first residential high-rises in Iran and have housed some of the most well-known Iranian figures over the years, including Amir-Abbas Hoveida, a prime-minister of Mohammad Reza Pahlavi. The construction was carried out by A.S.P construction company. The construction is believed to have started in mid-1960s. The complex consists of three buildings which are named A, B and C. The building named A is the greatest and the most luxurious in the complex.

The panoramic view of the three buildings includes the Alborz Mountain Range and the Damavand peak to the east and the Milad Tower to the west. They have been a landmark of Tehran and a major point in the city's skyline since being completed in 1976, The towers were inaugurated by the then Empress of Iran Farah Diba in the same year.

Current use 
The complex is still occupied and used today, with staggering prices for apartments inside the towers. The complex includes a gym, a kindergarten and a swimming pool.

Dozens of coffee shops, restaurants and stores are located on the ground floor of the complex which are accessible by the public.

Notable residents

 Amir-Abbas Hoveida, Prime minister of Iran under Mohamad-Reza Pahlavi
 Issa Omidvar, Famous world explorer and First Asian explorer of Antarctica
 Colonel Hasan Jalali, Imperial Iranian Air Force, Royal flight instructor
 Shapour Bakhtiar, Last Prime minister of Iran under the monarchy

Trivia

 The three buildings are 24 stories tall and not 22 as suggested by the elevators. The 23rd and 24th floors include penthouses not serviced by the lifts.
 Before the Islamic revolution sales of any units were subject to investigation and approval by Savak.
 Prime minister Shapour Bakhtiar spent the night in ASP after the collapse of imperial regime on the night of February 11th 1979 (22 Bahman). Unbeknown to him his Health Minister Manouchehr Razmara was also seeking refuge there at the same night. The two never met.

References

Skyscrapers in Iran
Towers in Iran
Buildings and structures completed in 1976
Buildings and structures in Tehran
Residential skyscrapers
1976 establishments in Iran